The Torre Mayor (literally "Major Tower") is a skyscraper in Mexico City, Mexico. With a height of 225 meters (738 feet) to the top floor and 55 stories, it is the third tallest building in Mexico. It was surpassed in height by Torre BBVA Bancomer in 2015, which in turn was surpassed by Torre Reforma. From its completion in 2003 until 2010 (when it was surpassed by the residential 236 meter (774 ft) high Ocean Two in Panama City, Panama) it was also the tallest building in Latin America. The Torre Mayor was developed by Canadian businessman Paul Reichmann, who also maintained part ownership until his death in 2013. It is also part-owned by a group of institutional investors. The building was designed by the architectural firms of Zeidler Partnership Architects and Executive Architects Adamson Associates Architects, both of Toronto. The structural engineers and designers were The Cantor Seinuk Group from New York City in association with Enrique Martínez Romero S.A. in Mexico City (Engineering News-Record, 30 June 2003).

Located at Paseo de la Reforma, it was built by Canadian-owned Reichmann International on the former location of the Cine Chapultepec. Construction work began in 1999 and was finished in late 2003. Due to Mexico City's high propensity to earthquakes, the tower incorporates several anti-earthquake measures. Torre Mayor is one of the strongest buildings on Earth in terms of earthquake resistance, being designed to withstand earthquakes measuring 8.5 on the Richter Scale. The U.S. Bank Tower in earthquake prone Los Angeles, California by comparison, is designed to withstand an 8.3 intensity earthquake.

Earthquake resistance
The Torre Mayor stands in the lakebed area where most of the 1985 earthquake damage occurred, It was built with 96 dampers, which work like car shock absorbers to block the resonating effect of the lakebed and its own height.  These diamond-shaped dampers are seen architecturally on its perimeter. With this extra bracing, this tower can withstand earthquake forces nearly four times as efficiently as a conventionally damped building. The dampening system proved its worth in January 2003, as a 7.6 earthquake shook the city.  Not only did the building survive undamaged, occupants inside at the time did not know a tremor had occurred.

Important details
The tower has 30,000 m² of glass on the south facade with thermal and acoustic insulation, plus finished marble inside and granite in common areas and hallways. The architecture of the building is contemporary and international quality. It also has three electric power supplies in average voltage, and it is noteworthy that it is the only building in Latin America that feeds energy from three different points of the city.
It has 29 passenger elevators, which can reach a top speed of 6.7 m/s.
It is occupied by more than 8,000 people.
It was built at an average of 4 floors per week, and no workers died during its construction.
Has record for being the only skyscraper in the world that has not had any major accidents or deaths during construction.
Received LEED certification in 2013.
It uses solar energy.

Intelligent building

Torre Mayor's elevators have a seismic detector that detects any movement of earth and therefore automatically stops the elevator nearest to allow passengers to get off. The Torre Mayor is administered by the Building Management System (BMS), an intelligent system that controls all facilities and equipment harmoniously and efficiently to protect human life from danger. The integrated system has the ability to control elevators, fire protection and lighting in the building and it is considered an intelligent building like that of many other buildings in Mexico City. The floors' underground injection machines have fans and fresh air exchange to prevent excessive concentration of pollutants entering the building, which is also linked to the intelligent building system. It was the first building in Mexico that met the now mandatory standard for energy efficiency of nonresidential buildings (NOM-008) and it has an automatic water saver, which is one of the first to be used in Mexico City, making it a green building.

Systems

The Torre Mayor has the following systems:
System generation and distribution of energy saving ice water
System variable air volume (air units and preparations of high-speed pipeline at every level of office)
General health extraction system in each office level
System automatic air ventilation in parking
Mechanical extraction system garbage room
Air conditioning system automatic mini-split type for control room, administration, sales and boardroom

See also
List of tallest buildings in Mexico City

References

External links

http://skyscraperpage.com/cities/?buildingID=372
Torre Mayor website
Torre Mayor on Emporis
WSP Group - project page dedicated to Torre Mayor

Cuauhtémoc, Mexico City
Office buildings completed in 2003
Paseo de la Reforma
Skyscraper office buildings in Mexico City